The Act against Blasphemy 1661 was an Act of the Parliament of Scotland (1661c. n).

The Act enshrined the blasphemy offence into statute. It legislated that anyone who should rail upon and curse God or the Trinity, even if 'distracted', should be punished. The punishment was the death penalty.

The Act against Blasphemy 1695 further clarified the offence and blasphemy was later abolished in 1813 under the Unitarian Relief Act.

References

Law about religion in the United Kingdom
Acts of the Parliament of Scotland
1661 in Scotland

Church of Scotland